The Zurich Seville Marathon is a marathon held annually in the streets of Seville, Spain since 1985. It is organized by the department of sports of the town hall and sponsored by both public and private organizations. It was used as a host of the 1999 World Championships in Athletics marathon event. In 2018 was for the first time selected as a Gold Label Road Race by IAAF.

The women's course record (2:18:51) was set by Ethiopian Alemu Megertu in 2022, men's (2:04:43) was set also by Ethiopian, Asrar Abderehman, in 2022.

Winners
Key:

References
Seville Marathon. Association of Road Racing Statisticians. Retrieved on 2018-02-25.

External links
Official website

Marathons in Spain
Recurring sporting events established in 1985
1985 establishments in Spain
Sports competitions in Seville